Paul Raymond may refer to:

Paul Raymond (archivist) (1833–1878), French archivist and historian
Paul Raymond (ice hockey) (1913–1995), Canadian ice hockey player
Paul Raymond (publisher) (1925–2008), British magazine publisher and owner of the Raymond Revuebar club in Soho, London
Paul Raymond (musician) (1945–2019), English keyboardist/guitarist
Paul Raymond (American football) (born 1986), American football wide receiver